Music from the Edge of Heaven is the final studio album from British pop duo Wham!. It was released on July 1, 1986 by Columbia Records.

Music from the Edge of Heaven was only released in North America and Japan. In other territories, an album called The Final was released. Both albums share some of the same songs. Music from the Edge of Heaven generally acted as a studio album from Wham! for the North American and Japanese markets. It consisted of some songs not available on The Final as well. The Final was a greatest hits album as it included a few of the same songs, but also included many of their previous hits from their two prior albums. Decades later, Music from the Edge of Heaven was not included in the CD remastering series by the duo's record company because of the album's limited release; however, The Final was included.

"The Edge of Heaven", "Battlestations", "Wham Rap! '86" and "Where Did Your Heart Go?", according to the liner notes, are newly recorded for the album, with "The Edge of Heaven", "Battlestations" and "Where Did Your Heart Go?" also appearing on The Final; the other half was slightly changed for the collection, with the exception of the Pudding Mix of "Last Christmas":
The version of "A Different Corner" featured has an intro that does not appear elsewhere, aside from the song's music video.
The version of "I'm Your Man" is slightly edited down from the Stimulation Mix and features a newly-recorded spoken bridge.
This marks the only appearance of "Blue" (live in China) on CD.

A box set of the three studio albums by the band entitled Original Album Classics was released on March 20, 2015, which included Music from the Edge of Heaven.

Although it did not have a physical release in forms such as vinyl or CD in Europe, Music from the Edge of Heaven was released in Europe on iTunes for the first time to download in late 2017.

Track listing

Personnel

George Michael – vocals, keyboards, piano, drum machine, arranger, producer
Andrew Ridgeley - backing vocals, guitar
Danny Cummings – drums, percussion
Andy Duncan – drums, percussion
Charlie Morgan – drums, percussion
Trevor Murrell – drums, percussion
Deon Estus – bass
John McKenzie – bass
Bob Carter – keyboards, piano
Richard Cottle – keyboards, piano
Tommy Eyre – keyboards, piano
Elton John – keyboards, piano
Danny Schogger  – keyboards, piano
Robert Ahwai – guitar
David Austin – guitar
David Baptiste – saxophone
Andy Hamilton – saxophone
Guy Barker – horns
Simon Gardner – horns
Chris Hunter – horns
Paul Spong – horns
Rick Taylor – horns
Shirlie Holliman – backing vocals
Helen "Pepsi" DeMacque – backing vocals
Janet Mooney – backing vocals
Leroy Osbourne – backing vocals
Jenny Hallet   - backing vocals
Dee C. Lee – backing vocals
Technical
Chris Porter – engineer, mixing

Charts

Weekly charts

Year-end charts

Certifications

References

1986 compilation albums
Wham! albums
Columbia Records compilation albums